Jia County, also known by its Chinese name Jiaxian, is a county in Yulin City, in the north of Shaanxi province, China, bordering Shanxi province across the Yellow River to the east.

History

The seat of Jia County was formerly known as Jiazhou when it was the seat of a prefecture during imperial times.

Administrative divisions
As 2019, Jia County is divided to 1 subdistricts and 12 towns. 
Subdistricts
 Jiazhou Subdistrict

Towns

Climate

References

 
County-level divisions of Shaanxi
Yulin, Shaanxi